Aqil Davidson, sometimes socially referred to as A-Plus or Empra, is an American lyricist, hip-hop artist, and record producer. He is known for being front man and lead rapper of hip-hop / new jack swing brand  Wreckx-n-Effect and writing, producing, and being featured on songs by Michael Jackson, Bobby Brown, MC Hammer, MC Lyte, and Guy.

Career 
Davidson formed Wreckx-n-Effect with Riley and Mitchell in 1988. He released three albums with the group: the self-titled Wreckx-n-Effect in 1989, with the breakout #1 rap chart hit "New Jack Swing", Then the RIAA certified platinum "Hard or Smooth" in 1992, containing the multi-platinum smash Rump Shaker and Raps New Generation in 1996. Wreckx is most known for the singles “New Jack Swing” and “Rump Shaker” which hit the No. 2 position on Billboard 100 in January 1993. Both of the singles reached the #1 ranking on Billboard's Hot Rap Songs chart.

Davidson served as a producer, composer, and featured artist  for new jack swing group Guy’s album The Future, which was released in 1990. Davidson worked closely with Guy member Teddy Riley on his projects with Wreckx-n-Effect.

In 2019, Davidson released a remix of “Rump Shaker” alongside Wreckx-n-Effects bandmate Markell Riley to promote liqueur brand Rumple Minze.

Personal life 
In 2020, Davidson was part of a group of celebrities who signed a publicly released letter urging the state of New York to repeal section 50-A of New York’s Civil Rights Law in the wake of the murder of George Floyd.

Discography

As featured artist

As a songwriter

References 

MCA Records artists
Motown artists
Atlantic Records artists
American rappers
Songwriters from New York (state)
Living people
Year of birth missing (living people)